In category theory, an abstract branch of mathematics, distributive laws between monads are a way to express abstractly that two algebraic structures distribute one over the other one.

However, there is a natural monad structure on the functor ST if there is a distributive law of the monad S over the monad T.

Formally, a distributive law of the monad S over the monad T is a natural transformation

such that the diagrams
          
          
commute.

This law induces a composite monad ST with
 as multiplication: ,
 as unit: .

See also 
 distributive law

References 
 

 
 

Adjoint functors